Outrider, or Outriders may refer to:

 Outrider (album) by Jimmy Page
 Outrider (Star Wars), Dash Rendar's YT-2400 freighter in the Shadows of the Empire multimedia campaign
 Motorcycle outrider, in a law enforcement escort
 RQ-6 Outrider, unmanned aerial vehicle
 Outriders (TV series), an Australian TV series
 The Outriders, a 1950 American Western film 
 Outriders (video game), a 2021 video game.
 Outriders, an alien race created by Marvel Comics